The City of Alliance Central Park Fountain, located at 10th St. and Niobrara Ave. in Alliance, Nebraska, was built in 1935 by Civilian Conservation Corps workers.  In 1935, it was spectacular, having colored lights and timers.  It was completed in time for "Stampede Days" of June, 1935, in Alliance.

It was listed on the National Register of Historic Places in 1990.  It was deemed locally significant "in the area of engineering as an excellent example of an electrically powered, colored-light fountain produced during the 1930s by a nationally recognized manufacturer, General Electric."  Twenty thousand dollars was raised for its renovation in 1988.

References

External links 
More photos of the City of Alliance Central Park Fountain at Wikimedia Commons

Buildings and structures on the National Register of Historic Places in Nebraska
Buildings and structures completed in 1935
Buildings and structures in Box Butte County, Nebraska
Fountains in the United States
National Register of Historic Places in Box Butte County, Nebraska
1935 establishments in Nebraska